Hoya linearis is a species of flowering plant in the genus Hoya native to Nepal and China. This species is known for its distinctive foliage with  nearly cylindrical leaves.

References

linearis
Plants described in 1825